Karnali Bridge, the asymmetric, single-tower, cable-stayed bridge is the second longest of its type in Nepal and was built by international collaboration between USA, Japan and Nepal.

Overview 
It is the first and only cable-stayed bridge in the country till date. The bridge spans the Karnali River between the Kailali District and Bardiya District of western Nepal. The bridge was designed by Steinman, Boynton, Gronquist & Birdsall of USA, constructed by Kawasaki Heavy Industries of Japan and funded by the World Bank. It was inaugurated after six years of its construction date by the late Prime Minister Girija Prasad Koirala.

Location
The bridge lies in Mahendra Highway at Chisapani at the border of Kailali and Bardiya district. The bridge site is 500 km from the capital city of Kathmandu, and 86 km from the closest airport facilities in Dhangadhi. The design of the bridge and its location have made it a tourist attraction for domestic and international visitors. The nearest city to the Karnali Bridge is the town of Chisapani in Far-Western Region, Nepal.

See also
 Narayani Bridge
 Sino-Nepal Friendship Bridge

References

The Karnali River Bridge was designed by Steinman, a firm that was later incorporated into the Parsons Corporation, USA.  Kawasaki Heavy Industries constructed the bridge.

External links

Karnali River Bridge in Structurae
Karnali Bridge at Sundarsudurpaschim.org

Bridges in Nepal
Cable-stayed bridges
Bridges completed in 1994
Tourism in Nepal
1994 establishments in Nepal